Ettinger is a surname. Notable people with the surname include:

 Amber Lee Ettinger (born 1982), American actress and model
 Bracha L. Ettinger (born 1948), Israeli painter
 Cynthia Ettinger, American actress
 Dan Ettinger (born 1971), Israeli conductor
 Jeff Ettinger (born 1958), American corporate executive, businessman, philanthropist, politician, and attorney
 Jessica Ettinger, American broadcaster
 Kurt Ettinger (1901–1982), Austrian fencer
 Meir Ettinger (born 1991), Israeli religious radical
 Philip Ettinger (born 1985), American actor
 Robert Ettinger (1918–2011), American academic
 Solomon Ettinger (1802–1856), Polish physician and Yiddish poet

See also
 G Ettinger Ltd., British leather goods manufacturer
 Etting